Fraternitas Rosae Crucis (Fraternity of the Rosy Cross or FRC) is a Rosicrucian fraternal organization established in the United States by Paschal Beverly Randolph in 1856, and is the oldest Rosicrucian Order founded in the US. They also operate Beverly Hall Corporation and the Clymer Health Center in Quakertown, Pennsylvania.

History
The FRC's first lodge was established in San Francisco in 1861, and closed soon after. In 1871 they established another lodge in Boston and in 1874, reestablished in San Francisco. In 1875 they finally settled in Philadelphia.

While Reuben Swinburne Clymer headed the order, the FRC established itself at Beverly Hall, in Quakertown, Pa.

Supreme Grand Masters
 Paschal Beverly Randolph (1858–1875)
 Freeman Benjamin Dowd (1875–1907)
 Edward Holmes Brown (1907–1922)
 Reuben Swinburne Clymer (1922–1966)
 Emerson Myron Clymer (1966–1983)
 Gerald Eugene Poesnecker (1983–2003)
 William Glen Kracht (2003–present)

See also
 Mysticism
 Esotericism

References

Sources

External links
 Official Web Site

Rosicrucian organizations
1861 establishments in California
19th century in San Francisco